Atyashevo is the name of several inhabited localities in Russia.

Urban localities
Atyashevo, Atyashevsky District, Republic of Mordovia, a work settlement in Atyashevsky District of the Republic of Mordovia; 

Rural localities
Atyashevo, Republic of Bashkortostan, a selo in Balyklinsky Selsoviet of Fyodorovsky District in the Republic of Bashkortostan; 
Atyashevo, Atyashevsky Selsoviet, Atyashevsky District, Republic of Mordovia, a selo in Atyashevsky Selsoviet of Atyashevsky District in the Republic of Mordovia; 
Atyashevo, Bolsheignatovsky District, Republic of Mordovia, a selo in Spassky Selsoviet of Bolsheignatovsky District in the Republic of Mordovia;